Troppo may refer to:
Troppo, a musical term meaning "too much"

Troppo (TV series), a 2022 Australian television series

Troppo Architects, an Australian architectural practice

See also

Troppo Man, a novel by Gerard Lee